Lejan (also Romanized as Ledzhan and Ledjan) is a village in the Lori Province of Armenia.

See also

Nearby towns
Stepanavan

Nearby villages
Bovadzor
Lori Berd
Amrakits
Agarak

References 

Populated places in Lori Province